Tun Perpatih Putih (died 1500) was the 6th bendahara of the Sultanate of Malacca. He succeeded his brother, Tun Perak, in 1498. He has been described as an  ineffective bendahara or prime minister, claimed to be due to his old age. Under his administration, political corruption was high in Malacca and struggles between the Gujarat Muslim and Malay people intensified. He was succeeded by the temenggung Bendahara Sri Maharaja Tun Mutahir in 1500 on his death.

References
https://web.archive.org/web/20060413202402/http://sejarahmalaysia.pnm.my/
Ahmad Fauzi bin Mohd Basri, Mohd Fo'ad bin Sakdan and Azami bin Man, 2004. Sejarah Tingkatan 1, Kuala Lumpur, DBP.

History of Malacca
People from Malacca
1500 deaths
Year of birth unknown